Franklin River may refer to:

 Franklin River in Tasmania
 Franklin River (Vancouver Island)
 Franklin River (Victoria)